The Magic Cottage may refer to:

The Magic Cottage (novel), a book written by James Herbert
The Magic Cottage (TV series), a children's television series broadcast on the DuMont Television Network in the 1940s and 1950s